Robert Finlayson "Robin" Cook (28 February 19466 August 2005) was a British Labour politician who served as a Member of Parliament (MP) from 1974 until his death in 2005 and served in the Cabinet as Foreign Secretary from 1997 until 2001 when he was replaced by Jack Straw. He then served as Leader of the House of Commons from 2001 until 2003.

He studied at the University of Edinburgh before being elected as the Member of Parliament for Edinburgh Central in 1974; he switched to the Livingston constituency in 1983. In Parliament, he was known for his debating ability and rapidly rose through the political ranks and ultimately into the Cabinet. As Foreign Secretary, he oversaw British interventions in Kosovo and Sierra Leone.

He resigned from his positions as Lord President of the Council and Leader of the House of Commons on 17 March 2003 in protest against the invasion of Iraq. At the time of his death, he was President of the Foreign Policy Centre and a Vice-President of the America All Party Parliamentary Group and the Global Security and Non-Proliferation All Party Parliamentary Group.

Early life
Robin Cook was born in the County Hospital, Bellshill, Scotland, the only son of Peter and Christina Cook (née Lynch) (29 May 1912 – 20 March 2003). His father was a Chemistry teacher who grew up in Fraserburgh, and his grandfather was a miner before being blacklisted for being involved in a strike.

Cook was educated at Aberdeen Grammar School and, from 1960, the Royal High School in Edinburgh. At first, Cook intended to become a Church of Scotland minister, but lost his faith as he discovered politics. He joined the Labour Party in 1965 and became an atheist. He remained so for the rest of his life.

He then studied English literature at the University of Edinburgh, where he obtained an undergraduate MA with Honours in English Literature. He began studying for a PhD on Charles Dickens and Victorian serial novels, supervised by John Sutherland, but gave it up in 1970.

In 1971, after a period working as a secondary school teacher, Cook became a tutor-organiser of the Workers' Educational Association for Lothian, and a local councillor in Edinburgh. He gave up both posts when he was elected as a Member of Parliament (MP) on his twenty-eighth birthday, in February 1974.

Early years in Parliament
Cook unsuccessfully contested the Edinburgh North constituency at the 1970 general election, but was elected to the House of Commons at the February 1974 general election as Member of Parliament for Edinburgh Central, defeating George Foulkes for nomination. In 1981, Cook was a member of the anti-nuclear Labour Party Defence Study Group.

When the constituency boundaries were revised for the 1983 general election, he transferred to the new Livingston constituency after Tony Benn declined to run for the seat. Cook represented Livingston until his death.

In parliament, Cook joined the left-wing Tribune Group of the Parliamentary Labour Party and frequently opposed the policies of the Wilson and Callaghan governments. He was an early supporter of constitutional and electoral reform (although he opposed devolution in the 1979 referendum, eventually coming out in favour on election night in 1983) and of efforts to increase the number of female MPs. He also supported unilateral nuclear disarmament and the abandoning of the Labour Party's euroscepticism of the 1970s and 1980s. During his early years in parliament, Cook championed several liberalising social measures, to mixed effect. He repeatedly (and unsuccessfully) introduced a private member's bill on divorce reform in Scotland, but succeeded in July 1980—and after three years' trying—with an amendment to bring the Scottish law on homosexuality into line with that in England.

After Labour were defeated at the general election in May 1979, Cook supported Michael Foot's leadership bid and joined his campaign committee. When Tony Benn challenged Denis Healey for the party's deputy leadership in September 1981, Cook supported Healey.

In opposition
Cook became known as a brilliant parliamentary debater, and rose through the party ranks, becoming a frontbench spokesman in 1980, and reaching the Shadow Cabinet in June 1983, as spokesperson on European affairs. He was campaign manager for Neil Kinnock's successful 1983 bid to become leader of the Labour Party. A year later he was made party campaign co-ordinator but in October 1986 Cook was surprisingly voted out of the shadow cabinet. He was re-elected in July 1987 and in October 1988 elected to Labour's National Executive Committee. He was one of the key figures in the modernisation of the Labour Party under Kinnock. He was Shadow Health Secretary (1987–92) and Shadow Trade Secretary (1992–94), before taking on foreign affairs in 1994, the post he would become most identified with (Shadow Foreign Secretary 1994–97, Foreign Secretary 1997–2001).

In 1994, following the death of John Smith, he ruled himself out of contention for the Labour leadership, apparently on the grounds that he was "insufficiently attractive" to be an election winner, although two close family bereavements in the week in which the decision had to be made may have contributed.

On 26 February 1996, following the publication of the Scott Report into the 'Arms-to-Iraq' affair, he made a speech in response to the then President of the Board of Trade Ian Lang in which he said "this is not just a Government which does not know how to accept blame; it is a Government which knows no shame". His parliamentary performance on the occasion of the publication of the five-volume, 2,000-page Scott Report—which he claimed he was given just two hours to read before the relevant debate, thus giving him three seconds to read every page—was widely praised on both sides of the House as one of the best performances the Commons had seen in years, and one of Cook's finest hours. The government won the vote by a majority of one.

As Joint Chairman (alongside Liberal Democrat MP Robert Maclennan) of the Labour-Liberal Democrat Joint Consultative Committee on Constitutional Reform, Cook brokered the 'Cook-Maclennan Agreement' that laid the basis for the fundamental reshaping of the British constitution outlined in Labour's 1997 general election manifesto. This led to legislation for major reforms including Scottish and Welsh devolution, the Human Rights Act and removing the majority of hereditary peers from the House of Lords.

In government

Foreign Secretary
With the election of a Labour government led by Tony Blair at the 1997 general election, Cook became Foreign Secretary. He was believed to have coveted the job of Chancellor of the Exchequer, but that job was reportedly promised by Tony Blair to Gordon Brown. He announced, to much scepticism, his intention to add "an ethical dimension" to foreign policy.

His term as Foreign Secretary was marked by British interventions in Kosovo and Sierra Leone. Both of these were controversial, the former because it was not sanctioned by the UN Security Council, and the latter because of allegations that the British company Sandline International had supplied arms to supporters of the deposed president in contravention of a United Nations embargo. Cook was also embarrassed when his apparent offer to mediate in the dispute between India and Pakistan over Kashmir was rebuffed. The ethical dimension of his policies was subject to inevitable scrutiny, leading to criticism at times.

Cook was responsible for achieving the agreement between the UK and Iran that ended the Iranian death threat against author Salman Rushdie, allowing both nations to normalize diplomatic relations. He is also credited with having helped resolve the eight-year impasse over the Pan Am Flight 103 bombing trial by getting Libya to agree to hand over the two accused (Megrahi and Fhimah) in 1999, for trial in the Netherlands according to Scots law.

In March 1998, a diplomatic rift ensued with Israel when Israeli Prime Minister Benjamin Netanyahu cancelled a dinner with Cook, while Cook was visiting Israel and had demonstrated opposition to the expansion of Israeli settlements.

Although reported to have had republican sympathies, he and Queen Elizabeth II were said to be on good terms due to their mutual interest in horses.

Leader of the House of Commons
Following the 2001 general election he was moved, against his wishes, from the Foreign Office to be Leader of the House of Commons. This was widely seen as a demotion—although it is a Cabinet post, it is substantially less prestigious than the Foreign Office—and Cook nearly turned it down. In the event he accepted, and looking on the bright side welcomed the chance to spend more time on his favourite stage. According to The Observer, it was Blair's fears over political battles within the Cabinet over Europe, and especially the euro, which saw him demote the pro-European Cook.

As Leader of the House he was responsible for reforming the hours and practices of the Commons and for leading the debate on reform of the House of Lords. He also spoke for the Government during the controversy surrounding the membership of Commons Select Committees which arose in 2001, where Government whips were accused of pushing aside the outspoken committee chairs Gwyneth Dunwoody and Donald Anderson. He was President of the Party of European Socialists from May 2001 to April 2004.

In early 2003, during a television appearance on BBC's debating series Question Time, he was inadvertently referred to as "Robin Cock" by David Dimbleby. Cook responded with good humour with "Yes, David Bumblebee", and Dimbleby apologised twice on air for his slip. The episode also saw Cook in the uncomfortable position of defending the Government's stance over the impending invasion of Iraq, weeks before his resignation over the issue.

He documented his time as Leader of the House of Commons in a widely acclaimed memoir The Point of Departure, which discussed in diary form his efforts to reform the House of Lords and to persuade his ministerial colleagues, including Tony Blair, to distance the Labour Government from the foreign policy of the Bush administration. The former political editor of Channel 4 News, Elinor Goodman called the book 'the best insight yet into the workings of the Blair cabinet', the former editor of The Observer, Will Hutton, called it "the political book of the year—a lucid and compelling insider's account of the two years that define the Blair Prime Ministership".

Resignation over Iraq war
In early 2003 he was reported to be one of the cabinet's chief opponents of military action against Iraq, and on 17 March he resigned from the Cabinet. In a statement giving his reasons for resigning he said, "I can't accept collective responsibility for the decision to commit Britain now to military action in Iraq without international agreement or domestic support." He also praised Blair's "heroic efforts" in pushing for the so-called second resolution regarding the Iraq disarmament crisis, but lamented "The reality is that Britain is being asked to embark on a war without agreement in any of the international bodies of which we are a leading partner—not NATO, not the European Union and, now, not the Security Council". Cook's heartfelt resignation speech in the House of Commons received an unprecedented standing ovation from some fellow MPs, and was described by the BBC's Andrew Marr as "without doubt one of the most effective, brilliant resignation speeches in modern British politics." Most unusually for the British parliament, Cook's speech was met with growing applause from all sides of the House and from the public gallery. According to The Economists obituary, that was the first speech ever to receive a standing ovation in the history of the House.

Outside the government
Following his 2003 resignation from the Cabinet, Cook remained an active backbench Member of Parliament until his death. After leaving the Government, Cook was a leading analyst of the decision to go to war in Iraq, giving evidence to the Foreign Affairs Select Committee which was later relevant during the Hutton and Butler inquiries. He was sceptical of the proposals contained in the Government's Higher Education Bill, and abstained on its second reading. He also took strong positions in favour of both the proposed European Constitution, and the reform of the House of Lords to create a majority-elected second chamber, about which he said (while he was Leader of the Commons), "I do not see how [the House of Lords] can be a democratic second Chamber if it is also an election-free zone".

In October 2004 Cook hosted an episode of the longrunning BBC panel show Have I Got News for You.

In the years after his exit from the Foreign Office, and particularly following his resignation from the Cabinet, Cook made up with Gordon Brown after decades of personal animosity — an unlikely reconciliation after a mediation attempt by Frank Dobson in the early 1990s had seen Dobson conclude (to John Smith) "You're right. They hate each other." Cook and Brown focused on their common political ground, discussing how to firmly entrench progressive politics after the exit of Tony Blair. Chris Smith said in 2005 that in recent years Cook had been setting out a vision of "libertarian, democratic socialism that was beginning to break the sometimes sterile boundaries of 'old' and 'New' Labour labels". With Blair's popularity waning, Cook campaigned vigorously in the run-up to the 2005 general election to persuade Labour doubters to remain with the party.

In a column for the Guardian four weeks before his death, Cook caused a stir when he described Al-Qaeda as a product of a western intelligence:

Some commentators and senior politicians said that Cook seemed destined for a senior Cabinet post under a Brown premiership.

In the 2005 general election, his first election as a backbencher in over 20 years, he held his Livingston seat with an increased majority of 13,097, where he remained until his death 3 months later.

Personal life
His first wife was Margaret Katherine Whitmore, from Somerset, whom he met at Edinburgh University. They married on 15 September 1969 at St Alban's Church, Westbury Park, Bristol and had two sons.

Shortly after he became Foreign Secretary, Cook ended his relationship with Margaret, revealing that he was having an extra-marital affair with one of his staff, Gaynor Regan. He announced his intentions to leave his wife via a press statement made at Heathrow on 2 August 1997. Cook was forced into a decision over his private life following a telephone conversation with Alastair Campbell as he was about to go on holiday with his first wife. Campbell explained that the press was about to break the story of his affair with Regan. His estranged wife subsequently accused him of having had several extramarital affairs and alleged he had a habit of drinking heavily.

Cook married Regan in Tunbridge Wells, Kent, on 9 April 1998, four weeks after his divorce was finalised.

Introduced to horse racing by his first wife, Cook was a racing tipster in his spare time. Between 1991 and 1998 Cook wrote a weekly tipster's column for Glasgow's Herald newspaper, a post in which he was succeeded by Alex Salmond.

Death
At the start of August 2005, Cook and his wife, Gaynor, took a two-week holiday in the Scottish Highlands. At around 2:20 pm on 6 August 2005, while he walked down Ben Stack in Sutherland, Cook suddenly suffered a severe heart attack, collapsed, lost consciousness and fell about  down a ridge. He was assisted after his fall by another hill-walker who refused all publicity and was granted anonymity. A helicopter containing paramedics arrived 30 minutes after a 999 call was made.  Cook then was flown to Raigmore Hospital, Inverness. Gaynor did not get in the helicopter, and walked down the mountain. Despite efforts made by the medical team to revive Cook in the helicopter, he was already beyond recovery, and at 4:05 pm, minutes after arrival at the hospital, was pronounced dead. Two days later, a post-mortem examination found that Cook had died of hypertensive heart disease.

A funeral was held on 12 August 2005, at St Giles' Cathedral in Edinburgh, even though Cook had been an atheist. Gordon Brown gave the eulogy, and German foreign minister Joschka Fischer was one of the mourners. Tony Blair, who was on holiday at the time, did not attend.

A later memorial service at St Margaret's, Westminster, on 5 December 2005, included a reading by Blair and tributes by Brown and Madeleine Albright. On 29 September 2005, Cook's friend and election agent since 1983, Jim Devine, won the resulting by-election with a reduced majority.

In January 2007, a headstone was erected in the Grange Cemetery, Edinburgh where Cook is buried, bearing the epitaph: "I may not have succeeded in halting the war, but I did secure the right of parliament to decide on war." It is a reference to Cook's strong opposition to the 2003 invasion of Iraq and the words were reportedly chosen by his widow and two sons from his previous marriage.

Explanatory notes

References

External links

 Guardian Unlimited Politics — Special Report: Robin Cook (1946 - 2005)
 
 TheyWorkForYou.com — Robin Cook MP
 Cook's "ethical foreign policy" speech, 12 May 1997
 Text of Cook's resignation statement in the House of Commons, 17 March 2003
 Video of Cook's resignation statement in the House of Commons, on the BBC Democracy Live website, 17 March 2003
 The Fruitceller 2 - A huge Video Archive for the Anti-War Movement Contains video of Robin Cooks resignation speech AND the Arms to Iraq Enquiry
 

Articles
 Robin Cook's chicken tikka masala speech, Robin Cook, The Guardian, 19 April 2001.
 "Obituary: Remembering Robin Cook One year on" from Labour Party (Ireland)
 "Obituary: Robin Cook" from BBC News
 "Obituary: Robin Cook" from The Guardian
 Cook resigns from cabinet over Iraq, Matthew Tempest, The Guardian, 17 March 2003
 "The sacrifice", Kamal Ahmed, The Observer, 10 June 2001
 "The struggle against terrorism cannot be won by military means", Robin Cook, The Guardian, 8 July 2005
 "Worse than irrelevant", Robin Cook's last article, The Guardian, 29 July 2005
 From the Lords to Lebanon, Labour misses Robin Cook, David Clark, The Guardian, 5 August 2006.

|-

|-

|-

|-

|-

|-

|-

|-

|-

|-

|-

|-

1946 births
2005 deaths
20th-century atheists
21st-century atheists
Alumni of the University of Edinburgh
British Secretaries of State for Foreign and Commonwealth Affairs
Burials at the Grange Cemetery
Chairs of the Fabian Society
Chairs of the Labour Party (UK)
Councillors in Edinburgh
Deaths from hypertension
Leaders of the House of Commons of the United Kingdom
Lord Presidents of the Council
Members of the Parliament of the United Kingdom for Edinburgh constituencies
Members of the Privy Council of the United Kingdom
Mountaineering deaths
National Union of Railwaymen-sponsored MPs
People educated at the Royal High School, Edinburgh
People from Bellshill
Presidents of the Party of European Socialists
Recipients of the Order of the Cross of Terra Mariana, 1st Class
Scottish Labour MPs
Scottish atheists
Scottish schoolteachers
UK MPs 1974
UK MPs 1974–1979
UK MPs 1979–1983
UK MPs 1983–1987
UK MPs 1987–1992
UK MPs 1992–1997
UK MPs 1997–2001
UK MPs 2001–2005
UK MPs 2005–2010